Sugar Symphony is the debut extended play (EP) by American recording duo Chloe x Halle. It was released under Parkwood Entertainment, under exclusive license to Columbia Records, on April 29, 2016. The EP was their first official release since being signed by Beyoncé. The EP features their debut single, "Drop". The music video for the single was produced by Shane Brown, directed by Andrew Hines and currently has over six million views on YouTube.

In March 2016, Michelle Obama introduced Chloe and Halle at the White House Easter Egg Roll, where they performed "Fall" from the EP, alongside Michelle Obama's "This Is For My Girls" and an unreleased track, "Baby Bird". In June, they performed "Drop" at the YouTube Music Foundry in New York City, and later in the month at the BET Awards 2016 in Los Angeles. In July, they performed songs from the EP as a support act for the European leg of Beyoncé's The Formation World Tour.

Track listing

Personnel

 Chloe Bailey – vocals (all tracks), production (tracks 1, 2, 4, 5)
 Halle Bailey – vocals (all tracks)
 Shane Brown – production (tracks 1, 5)
 Chauncey "Hit-Boy" Hollis – production (track 2)
 Rashad "Hazebanga" Muhammad – production (track 2)
 Samir Alikhanizadeh – production (track 3)
 Yonatan "xSDTRK" Ayal – production (track 4)
 Pierre-Luc Rioux – production (track 4)
 Tony Maserati – mixing (tracks 1–3)
 James Krausse – mixing (track 4, 5)
 Dave Kutch – mastering (all tracks)

Release history

References

2016 EPs
Columbia Records EPs
Contemporary R&B EPs
Albums produced by Hit-Boy
Chloe x Halle albums